The Stanton–Davis Homestead Museum (formerly known as the Robert Stanton House) is a historic house on Greenhaven Road in Stonington, Connecticut. It was built around 1700. The property has been a working farm for over 350 years, most by members of the Davis family.  As of 2012, the house was boarded up and the Stanton family society was struggling to raise renovation funds.

Description and history
The Stanton-Davis Homestead is located in southeastern Stonington, at the junction of Green Haven Road with the Osbrook Point Road. The principal feature of the homestead is the main house, a -story timber-framed structure with a gabled roof, central chimney, and shingled exterior. It is distinguished by its overhanging side gables, a sign of its great age, and its eaves, which are longer than typical for houses of the period. The interior follows a typical center chimney plan, with a narrow staircase in the vestibule that features fine carved woodwork posts and balusters thought to originate in England. Interior woodwork also includes fine carved panels and a built-in cabinet dating to the 18th century.  The house has never been fitted for a number of modern conveniences, including heating systems beyond its fireplaces.

On October 24, 1764, Robert Stanton, great-grandson of Thomas Stanton, the Indian interpreter, put up the farm as collateral on a debt. Thomas Fanning of Groton, Connecticut and Ezra L'Hommedieu of Long Island held the note and ended up owning the farm when Stanton could not repay the note by 1765. Not wanting to own a farm, Fanning and L'Hommedieu rented the property to John Davis of Long Island, and he bought the land outright in 1772. The property remained in the Davis family until the late 20th century, when it was passed to a family foundation, which was formed to preserve the homestead as a museum.

See also

List of the oldest buildings in Connecticut
National Register of Historic Places listings in New London County, Connecticut

References

External links 
 Stanton-Davis Homestead Museum

Houses completed in 1700
Houses on the National Register of Historic Places in Connecticut
Houses in Stonington, Connecticut
Museums in New London County, Connecticut
Historic house museums in Connecticut
Proposed museums in the United States
National Register of Historic Places in New London County, Connecticut
1700 establishments in Connecticut